Edward Arthur Henry Pakenham, 6th Earl of Longford (29 December 1902 – 4 February 1961) was an Irish peer, politician, and littérateur. Also known as Eamon de Longphort, he was a member of the fifth Seanad Éireann, the upper house of the Irish Parliament, in the 1940s.

Family and education
Edward Pakenham was born at 14, Curzon-street in London on 29 December 1902, the elder son of Thomas Pakenham, 5th Earl of Longford, and his wife Mary, Countess of Longford, née Child-Villiers. He was known as Lord Silchester from birth until 1915, and was the only one of the Pakenham children on whom his mother doted, apparently because he would succeed to the earldom on his father's death and because he was always in delicate health.

As a pupil at Eton College (where he twice received the Wilder Divinity Prize) he succeeded to the earldom when his father was killed in action at the Battle of Gallipoli on 21 August 1915.

He became an undergraduate at Christ Church, Oxford, and met his future wife, Christine Patti Trew, an Oxford "undergraduette". They were married on 18 July 1925. He died without issue and was succeeded by his younger brother Frank.

Politics and religion
He was an Irish Nationalist since his days at Eton, taking inspiration from the Easter Rising in 1916 and the Russian Revolution of 1917. He learned Irish and adopted the name Eamon de Longphort. His political views made him unpopular at both Eton and Christ Church, where he was famously put in "Mercury", the pond containing a statue of Mercury in Tom Quad.

He was an Anglo-Catholic who never left the Church of Ireland.

On 13 November 1946, he was nominated by the Taoiseach, Éamon de Valera as a member of 5th Seanad Éireann, filling a vacancy caused by the death of Professor William Magennis. He was not re-appointed to the 6th Seanad.

Theatrical and literary activities
Lord Longford became Chairman of the Gate Theatre in Dublin in 1930 and continued to work for the theatre until 1936, when he founded the Longford Players.

His plays include Ascendancy, The Melians, The Vineyard, and Yahoo (about Jonathan Swift). An excellent linguist and Classical scholar, he translated Le Bourgeois Gentilhomme, Le Malade Imaginaire, L'école des femmes, Tartuffe, and Le Barbier de Séville (from French) and Agamemnon and Oedipus Rex (or Oedipus Tyrannus) (from Greek) and adapted the novella Carmilla for the stage.

He often collaborated with his wife, Christine, with whom he was also responsible for redecorating Pakenham Hall, now Tullynally Castle, in Chinese style.

Pakenham Hall was often the scene of gatherings of Oxford-educated intellectuals such as John Betjeman, Evelyn Waugh, and Maurice Bowra.

Lord Longford also had several volumes of poetry published, some at the expense of his mother when he was still at Eton, but he is not considered to have been a very good poet.

Lord Longford is buried at Mount Jerome Cemetery in Dublin.

Publications
Aeschylus, The Oresteia of Aischylos, trans. Edward Longford and Christine Longford (Dublin: Hodges, Figgis; Oxford: B. H. Blackwell, 1933)
Edward Longford, Yahoo; a Tragedy in Three Acts (Dublin: Hodges, Figgs, 1934)
Edward Longford, Ascendancy, a Drama of 19th-Century Ireland, in Three Acts (Dublin: Hodges, Figgis, 1935)
Edward Longford, Armlet of Jade (Dublin: Hodges, Figgis, 1935)
Edward Longford, The Vineyard, Being the Story of Elijah, Ahab, and Jezebel, a Drama in Three Acts (Dubli: Hodges, Figgis, 1943)
Edward Longford, Poems from the Irish (Dublin: Hodges, Figgis, 1944)
Edward Longford, More Poems from the Irish (Dublin: Hodges, Figgis, 1945)
Edward Longford, The Dove in the Castle: a Collection of Poems from the Irish (Dublin: Hodges Figgis; Oxford: B.H. Blackwell, 1946)
Molière, The School for Wives, trans. Edward Longford (Dublin: Hodges, Figgis, 1948)

References

Sources and further information
Bevis Hillier, Young Betjeman (London: John Murray, 1988), ch. 15
thePeerage.com
Topical Budget: 'Shy Earl' as Blushing Bridegroom Topical Budget 726-1 (1925), BFI
Irish Playography
John Cowell, No Profit but the Name: The Longfords and the Gate Theatre (Dublin: O'Brien Press, 1997)
Christopher Fitz-Simon, The Boys (London: Nick Hern Books, 1994)
 

1902 births
1961 deaths
People educated at Eton College
Alumni of Christ Church, Oxford
Irish theatre directors
Irish theatre managers and producers
Irish male poets
Irish male dramatists and playwrights
Theatre in Ireland
Pakenham, Edward 
Edward
20th-century Irish poets
20th-century Irish dramatists and playwrights
20th-century male writers
Irish Anglo-Catholics
Nominated members of Seanad Éireann
Independent members of Seanad Éireann
6
Burials at Mount Jerome Cemetery and Crematorium